The Kataka Chandi Temple is an ancient temple dedicated to the Goddess Chandi, the presiding deity of Cuttack, Odisha, India. The temple is located nearby the banks of the Mahanadi River. It is famous for the annual Durga Puja and Kali Puja festivals. The Durga Puja festivities are prominent in Maa Katak Chandi temple which takes place for 16 days starting from dark fortnight of Ashwina Krishna Ashtami till Ashwina shukla navami and Vijayadashami. The goddess popularly called as Maa Kataka Chandi, sits and rules on the heart of the ancient city. She has four hands holding Paasha (noose), Ankusha (goad), gestures dispelling fear (Abhaya), and granting boon (Varada).  She is worshiped as Bhuvaneshvari Mahavidya (the queen of universe) by Sevayatas belonging to Utkala Brahmins every day. Maa Chandi is worshipped in various incarnations of Durga during the puja. In Cuttack, people strongly believe Maa Katak Chandi as 'The Living Goddess'.

Legend behind founding 
According to legend, the present piece of land, where the holy temple is located, was lying fallow before. Late Sri Hansa Panda, who happens to be the Purohit of the then King of Kanika, used to graze cattle’s and sheep’s in the land. One day Sri Panda was feeling tired and took rest on a heap of dry mud present there. While taking rest, he experienced a strange unusual feeling within himself. Surprisingly on the same night, The Goddess "Chandika" appeared in his dream and requested him to take her out of the land.

There after he went to the King and told everything about the strange experience he had that night. With the help of the king, Late Hansa Panda dug up the same piece of land. It is being said that around forty numbers bullock carts of Red Sindura came out while digging and then emerged The Deity of Maa Kataka Chandi. Then the temple was built on the same land. Here in Cuttack, the residents strongly believe Maa Kataka Chandi as The Living Goddess. The temple of Maa Kataka Chandi, the presiding deity of the city is visited by hundreds of devotees every day. The image of the deity is older than the temple. It is believed that she was the family deity of Gajapati Empire in the medieval age, due to Islamic invaders' attacks she was buried while the kings migrated to Puri.

History
Late Sri Hansa Panda started worshiping the Deity with utmost Niti, Nistha, and Sraddha. As per the scriptures related to Goddess Chandika or Bhuvaneshwari has four hands, showing weapons and gestures  as Paasa, Ankusha, Abhaya, Varada. She is worshipped as Bhuvaneswari while chanting Bhuvaneswari Mantra.

After Late Sri Hansa Panda, his only son Late Sri Lakshmana Panda started worshipping The Goddess in the same process and procedure. He was blessed with four daughters, named Champa, Tulasi, Mali and Malati. Those daughters were also helping their father Late Sri Lakshmana Panda, in the rituals (Seva Puja) of the Deity. Late Lakshmana panda always prayed Maa Chandi to have a son and after praying so many days, he was blessed with a son, named Sri Dayanidhi Panda, who also followed the footprint of his predecessors. The temple came to lime light during Sri Dayanidhi Panda. Number of devotees increased during his period. He has six sons, who are presently performing rituals (seva puja) of deity. They are namely Sri Narayan Panda, Sri Narahari Panda, Sri Somnath Panda, Sri Chakradhar Panda, Sri Loknath Panda and Sri Ratnakar Panda.

The above hereditary sevaks along with their fourteen sons are presently performing the Seva Puja (Rituals) in the Temple. The fourteen sons are Jagabandhu, Dinabandhu, Bikram, Gopal, Sarat Kumar, Sukhadeva, Bhagadeba, Manoj, Trilochan, Susant, Biswaranjan, Ramachandra, Pramod, Ranjit. It was established in the year 1946.

Present Status of the Land of the Deity
Raja  Shriman Shailendra Narayan Bhanjadeo of Kanika was declared as Hereditary Trustee by High Court, while Dayanidhi Panda’s family vested as Hereditary Sevaka.

Again, the Honorable High Court gave the order to frame a scheme for the temple. Now the institution of Kataka Chandi is managed under the said scheme. The management board comprises reputed persons of the locality along with top government officials for the management of the holy institution. One Executive Officer has been appointed by the commissioner to look after the functions of the temple.

See also
 Chandi Devi
 Chandi Mandir, Chandigarh
 Chandi Devi Temple, Haridwar

References 

Hindu temples in Cuttack
Shakti temples